The Big 12 Conference Pitcher of the Year is a baseball award given to the Big 12 Conference's most outstanding player. The award was first given following the 1997 season, with both pitchers and position players eligible. After the 2001 season, the Big 12 Conference Baseball Pitcher of the Year award was created to honor the most outstanding pitcher. It is selected by the league's head coaches, who are not allowed to vote for their own players.

Key

Winners

Winners by school
Because NCAA baseball is a spring sport, the year of joining is the calendar year before the first season of competition.

Footnotes
  Nebraska left in 2011 to join the Big Ten.
  Iowa State discontinued its baseball program after the 2001 season.
  Missouri and Texas A&M left in 2012 to join the SEC.

References

Awards established in 1996
Player
NCAA Division I baseball conference players of the year

es:Premio al mejor Baloncestista Masculino del Año de la Big 12 Conference